Chris Fishgold (born June 6, 1992) is an English mixed martial artist (MMA). Fishgold is the former Cage Warriors lightweight champion. He currently competes in the featherweight division in Bare Knuckle Fighting Championship (BKFC).

Background 
Fishgold started his first combat sport training at the age of 16 and knew he wanted master the sport after getting choked out by his teammate half his size on his first class in Ju-Jitsu class. He picked up Muay Thai and competed in mma professionally not longer after.

Mixed martial arts career

Early career 
Fishgold started his professional MMA career since 2010  and fought under various promoters primarily in England. He is the former lightweight Cage Warriors champion and he amassed a record of 17–1–1 prior signed by UFC.

Ultimate Fighting Championship
Fishgold made his promotional debut on October 27, 2018 at UFC Fight Night 138, facing Calvin Kattar. He lost the fight via technical knockout in the first round.

His second UFC fight came on February 23, 2019 against Daniel Teymur at UFC Fight Night: Błachowicz vs. Santos. He won the fight via submission in the second round.

Fishgold faced Makwan Amirkhani at UFC Fight Night: Gustafsson vs. Smith on June 1, 2019. He lost the fight via anaconda choke submission in the second round.

Fishgold was expected to face promotional newcomer Billy Quarantillo on December 7, 2019 at UFC on ESPN 7, but withdrew from the fight due to undisclosed reasons.

Fishgold faced Jared Gordon on July 16, 2020 at UFC on ESPN: Kattar vs. Ige. At the weigh-ins,  Fishgold weighed in at 149 pounds, 3 pounds over the featherweight non-title fight limit. He was fined 20% of he purse which went to his opponent Gordon and their bout proceeded at catchweight. Fishgold lost the fight via unanimous decision. After the loss, he parted ways with the promotion.

Bare-knuckle boxing
On August 20, 2022, Fishgold debuted for Bare Knuckle Fighting Championship at BKFC 27: London in the middleweight division and lost by KO in round 2 to Jake Bostwick.

Championships and accomplishments
Cage Warriors 
Cage Warriors Lightweight Champion (Four times)

Mixed martial arts record

|-
|Loss
|align=center|18–5–1
|Adrian Kępa
|TKO (rib injury)
|Levels Fight League 8
|
|align=center|1
|align=center|5:00
|Amsterdam, Netherlands
|
|-
|Loss
|align=center|18–4–1
|Jared Gordon
|Decision (unanimous)
|UFC on ESPN: Kattar vs. Ige 
|
|align=center|3
|align=center|5:00
|Abu Dhabi, United Arab Emirates
|
|-
|Loss
|align=center|18–3–1
|Makwan Amirkhani
|Submission (anaconda choke)
|UFC Fight Night: Gustafsson vs. Smith
|
|align=center|2
|align=center|4:25
|Stockholm, Sweden
|
|-
|Win
|align=center|18–2–1
|Daniel Teymur
|Submission (rear-naked choke)
|UFC Fight Night: Błachowicz vs. Santos
|
|align=center|2
|align=center|1:10
|Prague, Czech Republic
|
|-
|Loss
|align=center|17–2–1
|Calvin Kattar
|TKO (punches)
|UFC Fight Night: Volkan vs. Smith
|
|align=center|1
|align=center|4:11
|Moncton, New Brunswick, Canada
| 
|-
|Win
|align=center|17–1–1
|Alexander Jacobsen
|Submission (rear-naked choke)
|Cage Warriors 88
|
|align=center|1
|align=center|4:15
|Liverpool, England
|
|-
|Win
|align=center|16–1–1
|Nic Herron-Webb
|Decision (unanimous)
|Cage Warriors Unplugged
|
|align=center|5
|align=center|5:00
|London, England
|
|-
|Win
|align=center|15–1–1
|Jason Ponet
|Submission (guillotine choke)
|Cage Warriors 78
|
|align=center|1
|align=center|1:04
|Liverpool, England
|
|-
|Win
|align=center|14–1–1
|Adam Boussif
|Submission (rear-naked choke)
|Cage Warriors 77
|
|align=center|1
|align=center|1:33
|London, England
|
|-
|Win
|align=center|13–1–1
|Jordan Miller
|Submission (guillotine choke)
|Cage Warriors 75 
|
|align=center|1
|align=center|1:04
|London, England
|
|-
|Win
|align=center|12–1–1
|Alejandro Ferreira
|TKO (punches)
|ICE Fighting Championships 11
|
|align=center|1
|align=center|0:00
|Liverpool, England
|
|-
|Win
|align=center|11–1–1
|Benjamin Baudrier
|Submission (guillotine choke)
|ICE Fighting Championship 9
|
|align=center|1
|align=center|0:00
|Manchester, England
|
|-
|Draw
|align=center|10–1–1
|Ryan Roddy
|Draw (majority)
|Made 4 the Cage 18
|
|align=center|3
|align=center|5:00
|Newcastle, England
|
|-
|Loss
|align=center|10–1
|Gi Bum Moon
|Decision (unanimous)
|PRO FC 10
|
|align=center|3
|align=center|5:00
|Taipei, Taiwan
|
|-
|Win
|align=center|10–0
|Olivier Pastor
|Decision (unanimous)
|Cage Warriors 62
|
|align=center|3
|align=center|5:00
|Newcastle, England
|
|-
|Win
|align=center|9–0
|Marcin Wrzosek
|TKO (punches and elbows)
|Cage Warriors 57
|
|align=center|2
|align=center|3:31
|London, England
|
|-
|Win
|align=center|8–0
|Steve O'Keefe
|Submission (guillotine choke)
|Cage Warriors 52
|
|align=center|1
|align=center|1:34
|London, England
|
|-
|Win
|align=center|7–0
|Andy DeVent
|Submission (rear-naked choke)
|Cage Conflict 11
|
|align=center|2
|align=center|0:00
|Liverpool, England
|
|-
|Win
|align=center|6–0
|Jeremy Petley
|Submission (rear-naked choke)
|BAMMA 7
|
|align=center|1
|align=center|4:33
|Birmingham, England
|
|-
|Win
|align=center|5–0
|Danny Welsh
|Submission (rear-naked choke)
|OMMAC 10
|
|align=center|1
|align=center|1:08
|Liverpool, England
|
|-
|Win
|align=center|4–0
|Ben Rose
|Decision (unanimous)
|Night of the Gladiators 7
|
|align=center|3
|align=center|5:00
|Staffordshire, England
|
|-
|Win
|align=center|3–0
|Jules Willis
|Submission (guillotine choke)
|OMMAC 6
|
|align=center|1
|align=center|1:34
|Liverpool, England
|
|-
|Win
|align=center|2–0
|Phil Flynn
|Submission (armbar)
|Cage Conflict 5
|
|align=center|2
|align=center|0:00
|Accrington, England
|
|-
|Win
|align=center|1–0
|Neil McGuigan
|Submission (rear-naked choke)
|OMMAC 4
|
|align=center|1
|align=center|3:33
|Liverpool, England
|
|-

Bare knuckle record

|-
|Loss
|align=center|0-1
|Jake Bostwick
|KO
|BKFC 27: London
|
|align=center|2
|align=center|1:59
|London, England
|
|-

See also
List of current UFC fighters
List of male mixed martial artists

References

External links
 
 

1992 births
Featherweight mixed martial artists
Mixed martial artists utilizing Muay Thai
Mixed martial artists utilizing Brazilian jiu-jitsu
Living people
English male mixed martial artists
English Muay Thai practitioners
English practitioners of Brazilian jiu-jitsu
People awarded a black belt in Brazilian jiu-jitsu
Ultimate Fighting Championship male fighters